Vishal Das (born 1 January 1989) is an Indian cricketer. He made his first-class debut for Bihar in the 2018–19 Ranji Trophy on 20 November 2018. He made his Twenty20 debut for Bihar in the 2018–19 Syed Mushtaq Ali Trophy on 22 February 2019.

References

External links
 

1989 births
Living people
Indian cricketers
Bihar cricketers
Place of birth missing (living people)